Arthur Dion "A. D." Hanna (7 March 1928 – 3 August 2021) was a Bahamian politician who served as the eighth governor-general of the Bahamas from 2006 to 2012.

Early life
A. D. Hanna was born on 7 March 1928. His family moved to Hope Town, Elbow Cay, Abaco, Bahamas where his father was a lighthouse keeper for the famous red and white candy-striped lighthouse.

Despite the population of Hope Town being predominantly white, as the island was settled by British Loyalists banished from the American colonies after the American Revolution, Hanna attended school and received his education in a one-room schoolhouse like everyone else during this time period. Black, white, or mixed race like Arthur Dion Hanna, no one was refused an education. It cannot be denied that being of mixed race caused his early life to be challenging, as this era was unfortunately fraught with color barriers.

From there, he moved to Nassau and became involved in politics.

Political career
Hanna was active in Bahamian politics since the 1950s. As a member of the Progressive Liberal Party, Hanna represented the Ann's Town, Nassau constituency as an MP in the Bahamas' House of Assembly from 1960 to 1992.

During this time, Hanna assumed a number of important cabinet posts, including Deputy Prime Minister from 1967 to 1984, and Minister of Finance from 1973 to 1984.

In 1984, Hanna resigned his post as Deputy Prime Minister in protest at the retention by Prime Minister Sir Lynden Pindling of cabinet colleagues who were heavily criticised by a Royal Commission of Enquiry of that same year. The commission was established to investigate claims of high-level corruption allegedly linked to the flourishing drugs trade of the 1980s. His resignation came within a week of the firing from the Cabinet of Hubert Ingraham and Perry Christie, who also were said to have taken a strong stand against the presence in the cabinet of ministers tarnished by the commission and who both later served successive terms as Prime Minister.

On 1 February 2006, Hanna was appointed Governor General of the Bahamas by Queen Elizabeth II, Queen of Bahamas, on the advice of Prime Minister Perry Christie. He retired on 14 April 2012 and was succeeded by Sir Arthur Foulkes.

His daughter Glenys Hanna-Martin became an MP for Englerston.

In 2014, the first Legend-class patrol boat of the Royal Bahamas Defence Force was commissioned as HMBS Arthur Dion Hanna. He died on 3 August 2021, at the age of 93.

Honours
:
 Member of the Order of the Bahamas (2018)

References

1928 births
2021 deaths
Deputy Prime Ministers of the Bahamas
Finance ministers of the Bahamas
Government ministers of the Bahamas
Governors-General of the Bahamas
Members of the House of Assembly of the Bahamas
Progressive Liberal Party politicians
People from Acklins